The Dun class of  tankers comprised two ships, HMCS Dundalk and HMCS Dundurn, constructed for the Royal Canadian Navy during the Second World War. The two vessels were ordered by the Royal Canadian Navy to fill a need to transport fuel oil for convoy escorts in the Battle of the Atlantic. The two vessels began their careers in 1943 and remained in naval service until 1946. Following the end of the war, they were crewed by civilians as naval auxiliaries until the 1980s. Dundalk was wrecked in 1984 and Dundurns ultimate fate is unknown.

Description
The Dun class were armed with one QF 12-pounder 12 cwt naval gun and two single-mounted 20 mm Oerlikon cannon during the Second World War. The two vessels had a complement of 3 officers and 27 enlisted. This was later reduced to a total complement of 24.

Ships in class

Service history

Dundalk and Dundurn were ordered by the Royal Canadian Navy in 1942 after efforts to find a solution for the transportation of fuel oil for the convoy escorts along the Atlantic Coast had been found insufficient. The two ships were constructed by the Canadian Bridge Company at their shipyard in Walkerville, Ontario. Dundalk was launched on 4 July 1943 and Dundurn on 18 September of that year. Dundalk was commissioned on 13  November 1943 and Dundurn on 25 November.

During the Second World War, both vessels were used to transport fuel oil from refineries around Halifax, Nova Scotia to other naval bases along the Atlantic Coast being used by convoy escorts in the Battle of the Atlantic. Dundalk would sometimes be employed as a lighter. Following the end of the war, the Royal Canadian Navy intended to continue to use the vessels in this work instead of relying on civilian contractors. Dundalk was paid off on 9 April 1946. The vessel became a Canadian naval auxiliary vessel (CNAV) with a civilian crew but remained under naval control. Dundurn was transferred to the West Coast of Canada, based at Esquimalt, British Columbia and paid off on 2 January 1947 for service as a CNAV. In 1948, Dundalk was used to transport fuel oil from Halifax to Churchill, Manitoba in preparation for an Arctic cruise by large Canadian warships. In order to navigate in Hudson Bay, the ship was fitted with a gyro compass due to the poor navigation charts of the area. Dundalk remained in service at a CNAV and later as a CFAV (Canadian Forces auxiliary vessel) until 17 December 1982. Dundalk was wrecked on 7 November 1984. Dundurn remained in service on the West Coast until 1993. Thev vessel was eventually sold to the Burrard Yacht Club of Vancouver on 8 May 1996 to be used as a floating breakwater.

Notes

Citations

Sources

External links

 Blog post at warsearcher.com discussing fate of ships

Auxiliary ships of the Royal Canadian Navy
 Dun-class tanker
1943 ships